Behrouz Boroumand is an Iranian physician and political activist.

Early life and education 
Boroumand was born in Qaemshahr, Mazandaran province, and obtained his medical degree from University of Tehran Medical School. He did his residency in Hackensack, New Jersey and District of Columbia General Hospital, and gained a fellowship in nephrology and nephropathology at Armed Forces Institute of Pathology.

Medical career 
During the 1970s, Boroumand worked at the 'National Dialysis and Transplant Committee' of health ministry and collaborated in the first kidney transplantation service in Iran.
From 1976 to 1980, he was the president of 'Iranian Society of Nephrology' and office he holds for the second spell since 2000. He is acclaimed as "the founder and leader of kidney disease treatment in the Middle East" by the International Society of Nephrology (ISN), and received the society's Pioneer Award in 2014.

Political activities 
Boroumand has served in the leadership council of the Nation Party of Iran.

References 

Living people
Nation Party of Iran politicians
Year of birth missing (living people)
People from Qaem Shahr
University of Tehran alumni
Georgetown University School of Medicine alumni
Iranian nephrologists
Iranian pathologists
Iranian expatriates in the United States
National Front (Iran) student activists